Jack Green was one of the first three men in the UK to be graded to black belt in Shotokan karate, was an original member of the KUGB, and was their first national kumite champion.

Biography
Jack Green trained at the Red Triangle karate club in Liverpool, and studied under Hirokazu Kanazawa and Keinosuke Enoeda. In 1966, Green became the third person to pass a grading in the UK for a black belt in Shotokan karate, following Red Triangle clubmates Andy Sherry and Joseph Chialton. Green, alongside Sherry and Eddie Whitcher, was also one of the first to be graded to 2nd Dan in the UK, attaining the rank in 1967 at Crystal Palace.

In 1967, Green won the inaugural KUGB kumite championships.

In 1969, he founded the Blackpool School of Karate affiliated to the British Karate Federation. After Green left the club, Ian Smith took over at Revoe Gymnasium. The club then joined Shotokan Karate International under Asano Shiro, and later Kanazawa's 'Kodokai' under Kato Sadashige. Kato later affiliated with the International Japan Karate Association, under Tetsuhiko Asai.

See also
Shotokan
Karate Union of Great Britain

References

Shotokan practitioners
British male karateka
Living people
Sportspeople from Blackpool
Year of birth missing (living people)